The triaugmented triangular prism, in geometry, is a convex polyhedron with 14 equilateral triangles as its faces. It can be constructed from a triangular prism by attaching equilateral square pyramids to each of its three square faces. The same shape is also called the tetrakis triangular prism, tricapped trigonal prism, tetracaidecadeltahedron, or tetrakaidecadeltahedron; these last names mean a polyhedron with 14 triangular faces. It is an example of a deltahedron and of a Johnson solid.

The edges and vertices of the triaugmented triangular prism form a maximal planar graph with 9 vertices and 21 edges, called the Fritsch graph. It was used by Rudolf and Gerda Fritsch to show that Alfred Kempe's attempted proof of the four color theorem was incorrect. The Fritsch graph is one of only six graphs in which every neighborhood is a 4- or 5-vertex cycle.

The dual polyhedron of the triaugmented triangular prism is an associahedron, a polyhedron with four quadrilateral faces and six pentagons whose vertices represent the 14 triangulations of a regular hexagon. In the same way, the nine vertices of the triaugmented triangular prism represent the nine diagonals of a hexagon, with two vertices connected by an edge when the corresponding two diagonals do not cross. Other applications of the triaugmented triangular prism appear in chemistry as the basis for the tricapped trigonal prismatic molecular geometry, and in mathematical optimization as a solution to the Thomson problem and Tammes problem.

Construction

The triaugmented triangular prism can be constructed by attaching equilateral square pyramids to each of the three square faces of a triangular prism, a process called augmentation. These pyramids cover each square, replacing it with four equilateral triangles, so that the resulting polyhedron has 14 equilateral triangles as its faces. A polyhedron with only equilateral triangles as faces is called a deltahedron. There are only eight different convex deltahedra, one of which is the triaugmented triangular prism. More generally, the convex polyhedra in which all faces are regular polygons are called the Johnson solids, and every convex deltahedron is a Johnson solid. The triaugmented triangular prism is numbered among the Johnson solids 

One possible system of Cartesian coordinates for the vertices of a triaugmented triangular prism, giving it edge length 2, is:

Properties
A triaugmented triangular prism with edge length  has surface area

the area of 14 equilateral triangles. Its volume,

can be derived by slicing it into a central prism and three square pyramids, and adding their volumes.

It has the same three-dimensional symmetry group as the triangular prism, the dihedral group  of order twelve. Its dihedral angles can be calculated by adding the angles of the component pyramids and prism. The prism itself has square-triangle dihedral angles  and square-square angles . The triangle-triangle angles on the pyramid are the same as in the regular octahedron, and the square-triangle angles are half that. Therefore, for the triaugmented triangular prism, the dihedral angles incident to the degree-four vertices, on the edges of the prism triangles, and on the square-to-square prism edges are, respectively,

Fritsch graph 

The graph of the triaugmented triangular prism has 9 vertices and 21 edges. Therefore, this graph has subsequently been named the Fritsch graph. An even smaller counterexample, called the Soifer graph, is obtained by removing one edge from the Fritsch graph (the bottom edge in the illustration here).

The Fritsch graph is one of only six connected graphs in which the neighborhood of every vertex is a cycle of length four or five. More generally, when every vertex in a graph has a cycle of length at least four as its neighborhood, the triangles of the graph automatically link up to form a topological surface called a Whitney triangulation. These six graphs come from the six Whitney triangulations that, when their triangles are equilateral, have positive angular defect at every vertex. This makes them a combinatorial analogue of the positively curved smooth surfaces. They come from six of the eight deltahedra—excluding the two that have a vertex with a triangular neighborhood. As well as the Fritsch graph, the other five are the graphs of the regular octahedron, regular icosahedron, pentagonal bipyramid, snub disphenoid, and gyroelongated square bipyramid.

Dual associahedron

The dual polyhedron of the triaugmented triangular prism has a face for each vertex of the triaugmented triangular prism, and a vertex for each face. It is an enneahedron (that is, a nine-sided polyhedron) that can be realized with three non-adjacent square faces, and six more faces that are congruent irregular pentagons. It is also known as an order-5 associahedron, a polyhedron whose vertices represent the 14 triangulations of a regular hexagon. A less-symmetric form of this dual polyhedron, obtained by slicing a truncated octahedron into four congruent quarters by two planes that perpendicularly bisect two parallel families of its edges, is a space-filling polyhedron.

More generally, when a polytope is the dual of an associahedron, its boundary (a simplicial complex of triangles, tetrahedra, or higher-dimensional simplices) is called a "cluster complex". In the case of the triaugmented triangular prism, it is a cluster complex of type , associated with the  Dynkin diagram , the  root system, and the  cluster algebra. The connection with the associahedron provides a correspondence between the nine vertices of the triaugmented triangular prism and the nine diagonals of a hexagon. The edges of the triaugmented triangular prism correspond to pairs of diagonals that do not cross, and the triangular faces of the triaugmented triangular prism correspond to the triangulations of the hexagon (consisting of three non-crossing diagonals). The triangulations of other regular polygons correspond to polytopes in the same way, with dimension equal to the number of sides of the polygon minus three.

Applications
In the geometry of chemical compounds, it is common to visualize an atom cluster surrounding a central atom as a polyhedron—the convex hull of the surrounding atoms' locations. The tricapped trigonal prismatic molecular geometry describes clusters for which this polyhedron is a triaugmented triangular prism, although not necessarily one with equilateral triangle faces. For example, the lanthanides from lanthanum to dysprosium dissolve in water to form cations surrounded by nine water molecules arranged as a triaugmented triangular prism.

In the Thomson problem, concerning the minimum-energy configuration of  charged particles on a sphere, and for the Tammes problem of constructing a spherical code maximizing the smallest distance among the points, the minimum solution known for  places the points at the vertices of a triaugmented triangular prism with non-equilateral faces, inscribed in a sphere. This configuration is proven optimal for the Tammes problem, but a rigorous solution to this instance of the Thomson problem is not known.

See also

References

Johnson solids
Deltahedra